Siederia rupicolella is a moth of the family Psychidae. It was described by Sauter in 1954. It is found in Germany, Switzerland, Norway, Sweden, Finland, Estonia and Latvia.

The wingspan is 11–16 mm. Adults have been recorded on wing from April to May.

The larvae feed on moss and algae.

References

Moths described in 1954
Psychidae
Moths of Europe